The Crease Range is a small, low mountain range in northernwestern British Columbia, Canada, located on north-central Graham Island of Haida Gwaii, between Lan and Adam Lakes. It has an area of 79 km2 and consists of hills. It is a subrange of the Queen Charlotte Mountains which in turn form part of the Insular Mountains.

References

Queen Charlotte Mountains